Salib al-Turkman or  is a town in northwestern Syria, administratively part of the Latakia Governorate, located north of Latakia. Nearby localities include Al-Shamiyah and Burj Islam to the south, Ayn al-Bayda, al-Bahluliyah and al-Shabatliyah to the east. According to the Syria Central Bureau of Statistics, Salib al-Turkman had a population of 3,466 in the 2004 census. Its inhabitants are predominantly Turkish-speaking Syrian Turkmen who are Sunni Muslims.

References

Populated places in Latakia District
Populated coastal places in Syria
Turkmen communities in Syria
Turkish-speaking territories in Syria